David Schrader (born 30 March 1977) is an Australian former professional rugby league footballer who played as a  for the Canberra Raiders in the NRL.

Playing career
Schrader was a Canberra junior. He was graded by the Canberra Raiders in the 1998 season. Schrader made his first grade debut in his side's 26–6 victory over the Melbourne Storm at Bruce Stadium in round 14 of the 1999 season. He also scored 2 tries on debut. Schrader played another six more first grade games for Canberra, the last of which was his side's 42–14 victory over the Balmain Tigers at Bruce Stadium in the final round of the 1999 season. This match would also turn out to be Balmain's final ever first grade game. He was released by the Raiders at the end of the season and never played first grade rugby league again.

After his departure from Canberra, Schrader went on to play for the Forbes Magpies in the Group 11 Rugby League competition.

References

1977 births
Living people
Australian rugby league players
Canberra Raiders players
Rugby league centres